Bonneville-la-Louvet is a commune in the Calvados department in the Normandy region in northwestern France.

Geography
The commune is located in the heart of the Pays d'Auge, 12 km east of Pont-l'Évêque and 18 km southeast of Honfleur.

Population

See also
Communes of the Calvados department

References

External links

 Official site

Communes of Calvados (department)
Calvados communes articles needing translation from French Wikipedia